Sinthusa kawazoei is a butterfly of the family Lycaenidae. It is endemic to the Philippines and found only on the island of Palawan. It was first described as a subspecies of Sinthusa privata distributed on Borneo. Treadaway and Schroeder raised its status to a distinct species in 2012. Forewing length is about 12–13 mm.

References

 , 1976: New Subspecies of Lycaenidae from Palawan (Lepidoptera). Tyô to Ga. 27(1): 19-24. 19-24
, 1995. Checklist of the butterflies of the Philippine Islands (Lepidoptera: Rhopalocera) Nachrichten des Entomologischen Vereins Apollo Suppl.14: 7-118.
 , 2012: Revised checklist of the butterflies of the Philippine Islands (Lepidoptera: Rhopalocera). Nachrichten des Entomologischen Vereins Apollo, Suppl. 20: 1-64.

Butterflies described in 1976
Sinthusa
Butterflies of Borneo